Scarface is a novel written  by Armitage Trail in 1929 and published in 1930. The 1932 film Scarface was based on it. The twenty-eight year-old author died suddenly of a heart attack in 1930.

Plot
The book's storyline is heavily inspired by the real life gangster Al Capone whose nickname was also "Scarface". It concerns the rise and fall of Tony "Scarface" Guarino, who after performing a hit on mob leader Al Springola, moves in to take over the illegal alcohol business in Chicago during the Prohibition Era. He is ultimately shot dead by his brother (who concurrently rises in the ranks of Chicago PD), who fails to recognise him due to the family believing him to have died in World War I.

Adaptations

1932 film

Scarface (also known as Scarface: The Shame of the Nation and The Shame of a Nation) is a 1932 American pre-Code gangster film starring Paul Muni as Antonio "Tony" Camonte. It was produced by Howard Hughes & Howard Hawks, directed by Hawks (with Hughes adding two moralistic scenes directed by Richard Rosson). The story is based on Armitage Trail's 1929 novel of the same name, which is loosely based on the rise and fall of Al Capone. The film features Ann Dvorak as Camonte's sister, and also stars Karen Morley, Osgood Perkins, and Boris Karloff. The plot centers on gang warfare and police intervention when rival gangs fight over control of Chicago. A version of the Saint Valentine's Day Massacre is also depicted.

1983 film

Scarface is a 1983 American crime film directed by Brian De Palma and written by Oliver Stone. The film tells the story of Cuban refugee Tony Montana (Al Pacino) who arrives in 1980s to Miami with nothing and rises to become a powerful drug kingpin. Rather than being a new adaptation based on the novel, the film is primarily a remake and major modernization of the 1932 film. The cast also features Mary Elizabeth Mastrantonio, Steven Bauer, and Michelle Pfeiffer.

Proposed second remake
Plans were made in 2001 for a sequel to Scarface titled Son of Tony with hip hop artist Cuban Link to write and star Universal Studios announced in 2011 that the studio is developing a new version of Scarface. On March 24, 2014, TheWrap reported that Pablo Larraín is in negotiations to direct the film, along with Paul Attanasio writing the film's script. The film's update will be an original story set in modern-day Los Angeles that follows a Mexican immigrant's rise in the criminal underworld as he strives for the American Dream. On August 10, 2016, Deadline Hollywood reported that Antoine Fuqua was in talks to direct the film. On September 28, 2016, Variety reported that Terence Winter would be penning the script for the film. In January 2017, Fuqua left the project and Diego Luna was cast in the lead role. On February 10, 2017, it was announced that the film would be released in theaters on August 10, 2018, with the film's script being written by the Coen brothers.

On March 30, 2018, it was announced that Fuqua will direct the new film with Gareth Dunnet-Alcocer writing the screenplay.

On August 9, 2018, the film had not been released in theaters as originally planned and filming had been announced to start in October 2018. Filming would take place in Los Angeles, Atlanta, and Mexico.

References

Pulp fiction
American novels adapted into films
1930 American novels
American crime novels